Tylospora is a genus of fungi in the family Atheliaceae. The widespread genus contains two species.

References

External links

Atheliales
Taxa named by Marinus Anton Donk